Lamwo District is a district in the Northern Region of Uganda. The town of Lamwo is the site of the district headquarters.

Location
Lamwo District is bordered by South Sudan to the north, Kitgum District to the east and southeast, Pader District to the south, Gulu District to the southwest, and Amuru District to the west.

Overview
Lamwo District was established by Act of Parliament, and it became functional on 1 July 2009. Before that, it was part of the Kitgum District. Lamwo District is part of the larger Acholi sub-region.

Population
In 1991, the Uganda national population census estimated the district population at 71,030. The 2002 national census estimated the population at 115,300. The population grew at a calculated annual rate of 4.1 percent between 2002 and 2012. In 2012, the population was estimated at 171,300.

See also
 Acholi people
 Districts of Uganda

References

External links
  Lamwo District Information Portal
 June 2010 Lamwo District Population By Parish

 
Acholi sub-region
Districts of Uganda
Northern Region, Uganda